Dotan may refer to:

Persons
Dotan (singer), full name Dotan Harpenau, a Dutch singer-songwriter born in 1986
Amira Dotan (born 1947), Israeli military figure and a former member of Knesset for Kadima
Aron Dotan (1928-2022), Israeli Biblical scholar
Shimon Dotan (born 1949), film director, screenwriter and producer

Places
Mevo Dotan, a communal village and an Israeli settlement

See also
Dothan (disambiguation)